Some Beasts is a 2019 Chilean film directed by Jorge Riquelme Serrano, with a script written by Riquelme and Nicolás Diodovich.  It was set and filmed in Chaullïn, an island located in southern Chile that was uninhabited for decades. It was  the big winner  at Toulouse’s 35th Films in Progress,  a prix that help to some rigorously selected latinoamerican films finding their way into the post-production stage,
Some Beasts won three of the four prizes given by the Festival:  the Films in Progress Prize; the Cine Plus Films in Progress Prize and the Distributors and Exhibitors Prize. 
Starring Paulina García and Alfredo Castro it was premiered in the New Directors section at the San Sebastián International Film Festival 2019, where it won the First Prize.

Plot

An eager family arrived on an uninhabited island on the southern coast of Chile, with dreams of building a tourist hotel in that idyllic location. However, when the man who transported them from the mainland disappears, the family finds themselves trapped on the island. With cold temperatures, no water, and no sense of security, their spirits and camaraderie begin to falter, revealing the darker aspects of the family's nature.

Cast

 Paulina García, as Dolores
 Alfredo Castro, as Antonio
 Consuelo Carreño, as Consuelo
 Gastón Salgado, as Alejandro
 Andrew Bargsted, as Máximo
 Millaray Lobos, as Ana
 Nicolás Zárate, as Nicolás

External links
 
  Some Beasts, official international Trailer

References

2019 films
Chilean drama films
Incest in film
Films set in Chile
Films shot in Chile
2010s Spanish-language films